Siri Rat (also spelled Siriraj) is one of the 180 sub-districts (khwaeng) of Bangkok, Thailand, covering the area around Siriraj Hospital, located on the southern rim of Khlong (canal) Bangkok Noi mouth to the western bank of the Chao Phraya River in Bangkok Noi District. It is also named for the road intersection of Thanon (Road) Arun Ammarin and Thanon Wang Lang at the front of the hospital.

Attractions 

The area is also included into Rattanakosin Island historical area as it used to be Thon Buri downtown (formerly capital of Thailand around 1768-1782). The major features in Siri Rat are the Faculty of Medicine Siriraj Hospital, Mahidol University, the oldest government hospital and the largest medical institution of Thailand, Wang Lang ladies market and Wat Rakhang, Temple of the Bell, the major temple with many exquisite fine arts. Outside the area just the northern rim of Khlong Bangkok Noi, there is also the National Museum of Royal Barge, where 8 important barges are preserved and displayed.

Transportation

Boat 
Wang Lang or Siri Rat Pier is the main pier for the area, consists of the ferry crossing-river boat service to Tha Chang and Tha Phra Chan piers to the Grand Palace, Wat Phra Kaew and Sanam Luang; and the Chao Phraya Express Boat Service to northern suburb at Nonthaburi or Bangkok downtown at Si Lom and Sathon. Nearby there is also another Rotfai (Railway) Pier at the former Thon Buri Railway Station for the Chao Phraya Express Boat.

Bus 
There are several bus, public tuk-tuk or songthaew (public passenger pick-up vehicles) services to Taling Chan, Bangkok Yai, Charan Sanit Wong Road and Pinklao neighbourhood, and also the river-crossing bus lines through Phra Pinklao Bridge to Sanam Luang and Ratchadamnoen Road at another river side.

Railway 
There is also Bangkok Noi Railway Station (or the former Thon Buri railway station), which used to be the southern railway terminal, and became the terminal station of the Death Railway to Kanchanaburi built by Japan during World War II.

Main roads 
 Wang Lang Road
 Arun Ammarin Road
 Rotfai Road

See also
 Bangkok Noi District
 Siriraj Hospital

References

Subdistricts of Bangkok
Bangkok Noi district